Ruru is a town and municipality in Gulmi District in the Lumbini Zone of central Nepal. At the time of the 1991 Nepal census it had a population of 3628.

References

External links
UN map of the municipalities of Gulmi District

Populated places in Gulmi District